Michael Anthony Mauro (born September 29, 1948) was the Iowa Secretary of State.  He previously served as County Auditor and Commissioner of Elections for Polk County, Iowa for nearly a decade.  Mauro is also a former high school government teacher and coach, and is a graduate of Drake University.

Mauro was elected to be Iowa's 30th Secretary of State on November 7, 2006, with 541,234 votes, defeating Republican opponent Mary Ann Hanusa.

In November 2010, Mauro was defeated for reelection.

Notes

External links
 Facebook - Michael Mauro

1948 births
Living people
Secretaries of State of Iowa
Iowa Democrats
People from Polk County, Iowa
Drake University alumni
Politicians from Des Moines, Iowa